Indian Uprising may refer to:
 Indian massacre of 1622, in the English Colony of Virginia
 Indian Rebellion of 1857, an uprising in India against the rule of the British East India Company
 Indian Uprising (film), a 1952 Western film